The Iratapuru River is a river of Amapá state in Brazil. It is a tributary of the Jari River, which is part of the Amazon River basin.

The Iratapuru River flows from north to south through the  Rio Iratapuru Sustainable Development Reserve, created in 1997, where it is fed by many tributaries.

See also
List of rivers of Amazonas (Brazilian state)

References

Rivers of Amapá